Rajesh Puri is an Indian television actor. He acted in comedy serials like Yeh Duniya Gazab Ki. Rajesh  also acted in a DD1 serial Aamrapali (TV serial) in 2002. He is also identified as Lalit Prasad (a.k.a. Lalloo) of Hum Log, the Television series of the 1980s.  He is seen in mostly comedy shows like Hi Zindagi Bye Zindagi (Zee TV), One Two Ka Four (Zee TV), Ek Se Badh Kar Ek (DD National) and Fantush (DD Metro). In 2019, he played Sunil Bansal in Shakti - Astitva Ke Ehsaas Ki on Colors TV and movie Zindagi Tumse (2019)

Life
He graduated from National School of Drama.

Advertisement
He played the role of "Cherry Chaplin" in the tv advertisements for "Cherry Blossom" brand of shoe polish.

Television 
His most famous roles have been:

 Lalit Prasad (Lalloo) in Hum Log, the first Indian TV soap serial
 Munimji (accountant) in Buniyaad

Selected filmography

References

External links
 Rajesh Puri on IMDb

Indian male television actors
Living people
National School of Drama alumni
Year of birth missing (living people)
Place of birth missing (living people)